Bobby Mitchell (1935–2020) was an American professional football player who was inducted into the Pro Football Hall of Fame.

Bobby Mitchell may also refer to:

Sports

Baseball
Bobby Mitchell (1970s outfielder) (1943–2019), American outfielder and designated hitter
Bobby Mitchell (1980s outfielder) (born 1955), American outfielder
Bobby Mitchell (pitcher) (1856–1933), American pitcher

Other sports
Bobby Mitchell (footballer, born 1924) (1924–1993), Scottish footballer and manager
Bobby Mitchell (footballer, born 1955), English footballer
Bobby Mitchell (golfer) (1943–2018), American golfer

Other people
Bobby Mitchell (singer) (1935–1986), American R&B singer
Bobby Mitchell (died 1968), disc jockey who co-produced with Tom Donahue the last Beatles concert

See also
Bob Mitchell (disambiguation)
Robert Mitchell (disambiguation)